Mhère is a commune in the Nièvre department in central France.

According to the Institut Géographique National, between 1 January 2007 and 1 January 2008, Mhère was the geographic centre of the Eurozone, after its enlargement to Slovenia. With the admission of Cyprus and Malta, this centre was moved to Ouroux-en-Morvan.

Demographics
On 1 January 2019, the estimated population was 231.

See also
Communes of the Nièvre department
Parc naturel régional du Morvan

References

Communes of Nièvre